Foxnet was an American cable television channel that was owned by the Fox Entertainment Group division of News Corporation. Serving as a national feed of the Fox Broadcasting Company (known simply as Fox), the service was intended for American television markets ranked #100 and above by Nielsen Media Research estimates that lacked availability for a locally based Fox broadcast affiliate.

In addition to carrying Fox's prime time and sports programming, as well as its children's programming blocks, Foxnet also carried syndicated and brokered programs outside of network programming time periods. Fox handled programming, advertising, and promotional services for Foxnet at its corporate headquarters on Pico Boulevard in Los Angeles.

History

Background
At the time of the service's launch in 1991, Fox's programming reached only 91.75% of all U.S. households with at least one television set. This was because, around the time of the network's launch in October 1986, most large and mid-sized markets were served by at least four commercial over-the-air television stations – three that were affiliated with one of the three established broadcast networks, ABC, NBC and CBS, and one that usually operated as an independent station. The vast majority of Fox's charter affiliates consisted of independent stations that had no existing network partner (in most cases, aligning with the highest-rated independent within the market).

Many smaller markets were served by three or fewer commercial stations, most of which were already affiliated with at least one of the existing major broadcast networks, leaving Fox's only options to reach these areas being to either settle for a secondary affiliation with one of the major network stations (which would have forced Fox programs to air in off-peak timeslots subject to lower viewership) or affiliate with a spare low-power station, which often carried low-quality schedules prevalent with home shopping or paid programming outside of primetime and were usually associated with networks such as Channel America; the network rarely utilized either option in order to not associate their programming with low-effort stations and networks, leaving it with gaps in national clearance in several smaller markets, while it only carried secondary affiliations on Big Three stations only starting in 1994 to distribute their NFL coverage in some scattered markets until a stand-alone station could launch. To expand its distribution to these areas, original network president Jamie Kellner (who would remain in the role until his departure in 1993, when he co-founded Time Warner and the Tribune Company's network venture The WB) developed the concept of a national cable feed of Fox that would provide Fox network programming to smaller television markets throughout the United States where the network could not maintain an exclusive over-the-air affiliation – known as "white areas" – due to the limited number of commercial television stations available or where a local cable provider did not import the signal of an out-of-market Fox station to act as a default affiliate of the network.

Development and launch

On September 6, 1990, Fox reached an agreement with Tele-Communications Inc. – at the time, the nation's largest cable operator – in which TCI systems in certain markets would become charter affiliates of a cable-only version of the network, breaking the traditional method of broadcast networks offering their programming to over-the-air television stations that distribute content to local cable systems. John C. Malone, then the chief executive officer of TCI, referred to the agreement as "precedent setting" since it allowed TCI systems to obtain "network affiliate status" in places where Fox programming was not available. When it launched, Fox charged smaller cable providers that agreed to carry Foxnet a flat annual carriage fee of $100, instead of the monthly fees traditionally charged by other broadcast and cable channels; in turn, TCI agreed to pay Fox a subscriber fee of 6¢ per month, a precursor to the reverse compensation revenue model that Fox and other broadcast networks would adopt for their conventional stations by the early 2000s.

Foxnet launched on June 6, 1991, originally maintaining an 18-hour daily schedule (from 6:00 a.m. to 1:00 a.m. Eastern and Pacific Time). By 1992, Foxnet reached 1.3 million subscribers throughout the United States, and served nearly two million viewers at its peak. During its existence, the network never officially identified itself specifically as "Foxnet" on-air; its network identification consisted solely of the Fox logo in use at the time, with a voiceover reading "you're watching Fox."

As Fox expanded its presence to most television markets through primary affiliations with full-power or low-power broadcast television stations (the latter now more well-associated under the ownership of other full-power stations and refusing the low-quality networks and paid programming prevalent in the early low-power era), and by the mid-2000s, carriage on digital subchannels of stations affiliated with other broadcast networks, Foxnet's coverage had in turn shrunk to the point where very few areas had a need for the service. In addition, most cable providers in markets that remained unserved by a local Fox station until it acquired a standalone primary or subchannel-only affiliation began importing out-of-market affiliates to relay the network's programming (in many cases, replacing Foxnet on the provider's lineup), or in rare cases, partnered with an already-existing major network affiliate to create a dedicated Fox cable channel (one such example was CGEM in the Hannibal, Missouri/Quincy, Illinois media market, which was initially operated by NBC affiliate WGEM-TV and Continental Cablevision at the time of its launch in 1994 before migrating to a digital subchannel of WGEM-TV in 2006). Foxnet was also carried in portions of some larger media markets where a reliable signal from an over-the-air affiliate or a translator was not receivable; one such example included Eastern Iowa (where KOCR's signal only covered Cedar Rapids and Iowa City and not the cities of Waterloo or Dubuque; Foxnet was carried across most of Eastern Iowa between October 1994 and KFXB-TV's affiliation with Fox in August 1995 as KOCR was off the air during that time owing to financial issues). Viewers in Foxnet markets that had a subscription to a direct broadcast satellite service also had the ability to watch an out-of-market Fox station via a given provider after receiving permission from the network: DirecTV and Dish Network subscribers could receive network-owned KTTV (channel 11) from Los Angeles or WNYW (channel 5) from New York City; until that provider's 1999 merger with DirecTV, subscribers of Primestar could receive either Oakland/San Francisco affiliate KTVU (channel 2, also now a Fox owned-and-operated station) or Philadelphia affiliate-turned-O&O WTXF-TV (channel 29). However, in some cases, satellite subscribers could receive the Fox station with rights to the network's programming within the market. As a result, some areas that were not served by a Fox affiliate at the time of the network's launch never offered Foxnet; examples included Palm Springs, California (which was served by KTTV prior to KDFX-CD's affiliation with Fox), the South Bend region (which was served by WFLD, WXMI, and WFFT-TV prior to WSJV's affiliation with Fox) and the western portion of the Plattsburgh/Burlington market (which was mostly served by WNYW prior to WFFF-TV's sign-on).

From October 2001 to April 2003, most Fox programming in the state of Maine was only available via Foxnet, as WPXT (which served as the network's Portland affiliate) disaffiliated from the network to join The WB; that station had been carried by cable providers in Bangor since the network's launch. When WPFO and WFVX-LD affiliated with Fox, Foxnet was relegated to the Presque Isle area, which was one of the last few areas to not have a Fox affiliate of its own. A similar situation happened in southwestern Mississippi when WDBD initially disaffiliated from the network at that time also to join The WB; WDBD would eventually reaffiliate with the network in 2006, taking the affiliation from WUFX (which signed on in September 2003, now WLOO).

Discontinuation
As time went on, more local or adjacent-market Fox affiliates became available over-the-air or on cable in smaller markets. Eventually, Foxnet's national coverage was reduced to the level where it was only carried on a few small cable systems, none of which had more than 1,000 subscribers. As such, it no longer made economic sense for the service to remain on the air. It was for this reason that Fox's then-owner News Corporation (whose entertainment assets were largely spun off into 21st Century Fox in July 2013) made the decision to discontinue Foxnet. The service officially shut down on September 12, 2006; it was originally slated to cease operations two weeks earlier on September 1, but the shutdown was delayed in order to allow ABC affiliate WABG-TV (channel 6) in Greenwood, Mississippi and CBS affiliate WAGM-TV (channel 8) in Presque Isle time to quickly launch Fox affiliates on their second digital subchannels.

Because of Foxnet's shutdown, 13,000 cable subscribers nationwide were estimated to have lost access to Fox network programming. By this time, the network's market share had increased to 98.97% of all U.S. television households. Indeed, network executives had been looking forward to the point that its national penetration had increased to the level that Foxnet would no longer be needed.

The concept and programming strategy behind Foxnet served as the basis for The WB 100+ Station Group, a service owned by Time Warner and Tribune that operated from September 1998 to September 2006 – which was succeeded by The CW Plus, once The WB and UPN were shut down and replaced by The CW in September 2006 – for markets that did not have a WB-affiliated station; though unlike Foxnet, The WB 100+ – which was also co-founded by Kellner – was stylized (to an extent) similarly to an over-the-air broadcast station and local operators were allowed to tailor the service to their individual market with their own branding, with some of the outlets even carrying local news or sports programming. Foxnet, meanwhile, was formatted in the manner of a traditional cable channel with no local programming content provided by its carriers.

2017-present: Partial revival with Hulu and as emergency backup service
In May 2017, the video streaming service Hulu (then partially owned by 21st Century Fox, Fox's owner at the time) launched a live TV option which included live streams of the Fox affiliates and O&Os which had agreed to terms with the service to offer their stations to Hulu. In June 2017, The Wall Street Journal (a sister newspaper to Fox through their News Corp ownership) mentioned a secondary national feed was offered by Fox in several markets where the network's affiliates had not come to terms with Hulu to offer their streams to Hulu, mainly those involving Fox affiliates owned by Sinclair Broadcast Group and Raycom Media. However, the national Fox live stream differs in that secondary programming from Fox's sister cable networks, including Fox News Channel, Fox Business Network, and former sister networks National Geographic Channel and Nat Geo Wild (both now owned by The Walt Disney Company), is offered outside of network hours rather than any syndicated content, differing drastically from the structure of Foxnet. Like Foxnet, this national feed is likely to eventually end as the network's affiliates and Fox agree to terms to allow full streaming of stations under the Hulu live TV service and other streaming services under future affiliation agreements.

After the landfall of Hurricane Laura in August 2020, the Fox affiliate for Lake Charles, Louisiana, KVHP, was taken off the air as its studio facility (shared with fellow Gray Television NBC affiliate KPLC) took damage caused by the toppling of the studio transmitter link tower into the studio building. Fox then fed their default national feed meant for streaming use to local cable providers until KVHP resumed full operations at the end of 2020.

Programming

Foxnet aired the Fox network's primetime schedule and its children's programming blocks (originally Fox Kids, then FoxBox/4Kids TV from September 2002 onward); beginning with the network's assumption of rights to the NFL's National Football Conference in September 1994, it also carried telecasts of sporting events produced by the Fox Sports division, though being a national service having to choose from certain games rather than taking regional coverage, it was possible for an NHL, NFL or MLB matchup with teams with no rooting interest in a certain area to be of no interest to those viewers. In some areas where Foxnet was offered, affiliates of other networks carried secondary affiliations with Fox to air the network's sports programming (and in some areas children's programming) over-the-air; during this time, some cable systems blacked out Foxnet whenever sports programming was aired due to syndex laws.

Otherwise, a dual programming model was utilized for Foxnet that differed from the traditional affiliate model – in which the local station handled responsibilities for acquiring and scheduling syndicated and local programming to fill timeslots not occupied by network content – that is used by Fox stations in large and medium-sized markets. Fox maintained responsibility over the programming of timeslots within Foxnet's schedule that were not occupied by Fox network programming, absolving the local cable provider of the duty of having to acquire syndicated programming to fill timeslots outside of Fox's network schedule. The acquired programs primarily consisted of shows that were airing at the time in national syndication and classic television series; syndicated film packages – with most titles being sourced from the 20th Century Fox library – usually filled select weekend timeslots (which following the incorporation of Fox Sports in 1994, began to be limited to weekend time periods that were not occupied by sports programming), and, until 1993, primetime slots (Fox began offering primetime shows seven nights a week in the fall of that year). Fox also leased time to direct response program producers and ministries to carry brokered programming (such as infomercials and religious programs) during overnight and some morning and early afternoon timeslots.

Foxnet was designed for the Eastern and Pacific Time Zones; as such, the Fox Kids and (from September 2002 to September 2006, after the network leased its children's programming to 4Kids Entertainment) 4Kids TV blocks, which were designed to be tape-delayed, were aired an hour early on affiliates in other time zones. As the network was carried as a cable network without any broadcast distribution, the FCC's educational content regulations for children's programming did not need to be fulfilled, nor was it subject to any FCC regulations which applied to broadcast networks.

Foxnet carried one original program, The Spud Goodman Show, a talk show that aired Sunday nights at 10:00 p.m. Eastern Time – following the conclusion of Fox's primetime lineup – from 1996 to 1998. Though Fox did not carry any national news programming of its own at the time of its launch (and only has one news program presently on its schedule in the form of the political talk show Fox News Sunday), Foxnet did carry a simulcast of sister network Fox News Channel's daily evening newscast Fox Report in the 10:00 p.m. (Eastern) time slot from February 1, 1999, until Foxnet ceased operations; Foxnet had briefly considered producing a daily news program of its own in 1991, following the hire of former CNN executive Paul Amos to head the network's upstart affiliate news agency Fox News Service (whose functions have since been taken over by FNC-operated Fox NewsEdge).

Dramas

Comedies

Reality/other

Children's programming

See also
 WGN America – a cable channel that originally operated as a superstation feed of WGN-TV, which broadcast programming from The WB Television Network for markets without an affiliate from January 1995 to October 1999
 The WB 100+ Station Group – a similar cable-only network for markets without an affiliate of The WB, that operated from September 1998 to September 2006
 The CW Plus – a successor of The WB 100+; most of the remaining cable-only channels and some over-the-air stations that are outlets of The CW Plus formerly served as affiliates of The WB 100+ Station Group
 Univision – American Spanish-language network that offers a national cable/satellite feed for markets without a local affiliate
 UniMás – American Spanish-language network that offers a national cable/satellite feed for markets without a local affiliate
 Telemundo – American Spanish-language network that offers a national cable/satellite feed for markets without a local affiliate
 Azteca América – American Spanish-language network that formerly offered a national cable/satellite feed for markets without a local affiliate
 Estrella TV – American Spanish-language network that offers a national cable/satellite feed for markets without a local affiliate
 CTV 2 Alberta – a similar cable-only affiliate of CTV 2 in the Canadian province of Alberta (formerly known as Access)
 CTV 2 Atlantic – a similar cable-only affiliate of CTV 2 in Atlantic Canada (formerly known as the Atlantic Satellite Network and A Atlantic)
 Citytv Saskatchewan – a similar cable-only affiliate of Citytv in the Canadian province of Saskatchewan (formerly known as the Saskatchewan Communications Network)

Notes and references

Fox Broadcasting Company
Defunct television networks in the United States
Television channels and stations established in 1991
Television channels and stations disestablished in 2006
1991 establishments in the United States
2006 disestablishments in the United States